Finnerman is a surname. Notable people with the surname include:

 Gerald Finnerman (1931-2011), American cinematographer
 Finnerman, character in Hunters (2016 TV series)

See also
 Finneran